Riverview is a census-designated place in Wise County, Virginia, southwest of Coeburn. The population as of the 2010 Census was 782.

References

Census-designated places in Wise County, Virginia
Census-designated places in Virginia